Ivan Sergeyevich Komarov (born 15 April 2003) is a Russian football player. He plays for FC Rostov.

Club career
He made his debut in the Russian Premier League for FC Rostov on 19 June 2020 in a game against PFC Sochi. FC Rostov was forced to field their Under-18 squad in that game as their main squad was quarantined after 6 players tested positive for COVID-19.

Career statistics

References

External links
 
 
 

2003 births
Living people
Russian footballers
Association football midfielders
FC Rostov players
Russian Premier League players